Beautiful Soup is a Python package for parsing HTML and XML documents (including having malformed markup, i.e. non-closed tags, so named after tag soup). It creates a parse tree for parsed pages that can be used to extract data from HTML, which is useful for web scraping.

Beautiful Soup was started by Leonard Richardson, who continues to contribute to the project, and is additionally supported by Tidelift, a paid subscription to open-source maintenance.

Code example 

#!/usr/bin/env python3
# Anchor extraction from HTML document
from bs4 import BeautifulSoup
from urllib.request import urlopen
with urlopen('https://en.wikipedia.org/wiki/Main_Page') as response:
    soup = BeautifulSoup(response, 'html.parser')
    for anchor in soup.find_all('a'):
        print(anchor.get('href', '/'))

Advantages and disadvantages of parsers

This table summarizes the advantages and disadvantages of each parser library

Release

Beautiful Soup 3 was the official release line of Beautiful Soup from May 2006 to March 2012. The current release is Beautiful Soup 4.x. Beautiful Soup 4 can be installed with pip install beautifulsoup4.

In 2021, Python 2.7 support was retired and the release 4.9.3 was the last to support the Python 2.7.

See also
 Comparison of HTML parsers
 jsoup
 Nokogiri

References 

Python (programming language) libraries
Software using the MIT license
HTML parsers
XML parsers